Al-Miqdadiya Sport Club, is an Iraqi football team based in Al-Miqdadiya District, Diyala, that plays in Iraq Division Three.

History

War on terror
In July 2017, the president of Al-Muqdadiya Club Sarmad Hadi announced that all the players, employees and members of the club’s administrative body volunteered on the battle fronts in the ranks of the Popular Mobilization Forces with the Iraqi Armed Forces to confront ISIS, which occupied areas in Iraq, after the players received special training on weapons.

Managerial history
 Salam Al-Magsousi

See also 
 1998–99 Iraq FA Cup
 2000–01 Iraqi Elite League

References

External links
 Al-Miqdadiya SC on Goalzz.com
 Iraq Clubs- Foundation Dates

1972 establishments in Iraq
Association football clubs established in 1972
Football clubs in Diyala